Jade Hills is located in Kajang, Selangor. Jade Hills is Gamuda Land’s first township to feature a contemporary oriental theme. It is easily accessible via major highways such as the Sungai Besi Expressway, North-South Expressway, South Klang Valley Expressway and Kajang Dispersal Link Expressway (SILK).

This development is also within close vicinity of several golf clubs (UPM Golf, IlSAS Recreational Golf Club, Kajang Hill Golf Club, Saujana Impian Golf Club, Sungai Long Golf Club, Mines Golf Club and IOI Palm golf), three universities (Universiti Putra Malaysia (UPM), Universiti Tenaga Nasional (UNITEN), Universiti Kebangsaan Malaysia (UKM))and three international schools (Alice Smith International School, Australian International School, Malaysia and Tanarata International School). Within Jade Hills itself there is also Eaton International School which opened for classes in September 2013.

Type of development

There will be 793 units planned to be built in the 12 phases with a low density of three units per acre to enforce privacy and exclusivity.

Design concept
Jade Hills is a lifestyle residential development with Oriental inspired design built on hills overlooking lakes.  Homes here are built with views of the surrounding areas such as the landscaped green belt and the three lakes – Misty Lake, Willow Sweeps and Water Spring.

Jade Hills Resort Club is a resident’s only clubhouse which features an Olympic-sized swimming pool, children’s wading pool, spa pool, three tennis courts, gymnasium, multi-purpose function hall, steam and sauna room, games room, children’s playground and a Chinese teahouse.

External links
 Gamuda Land
 Jade Hills official website

Townships in Selangor
Kajang